Counterpoint is a 1979 bronze sculpture by Dennis Smith, installed in Salt Lake City, Utah, United States.

Description and history
One statue depicts a man with a boy on his shoulders and the other depicts a woman swinging a girl around. The sculpture was surveyed by the Smithsonian Institution's "Save Outdoor Sculpture!" program in 1993.

References

1979 sculptures
Bronze sculptures in Utah
Outdoor sculptures in Salt Lake City
Sculptures of children in the United States
Sculptures of men in Utah
Sculptures of women in Utah
Statues in Utah